The Ministry of Maritime Affairs, Transport and Infrastructure of the Republic of Croatia (MMPI RH) is a ministry in the Government of Croatia.

List of ministers

Role
The Ministry of the Sea, Transport and Infrastructure performs administrative and other tasks related to:

 domestic international maritime, nautical, road, rail, air and postal traffic; the system of transport by cable cars, funiculars and lifts and transport on inland waters with the infrastructure of these modes of transport;

 planning, drafting and implementation of strategic documents and transport infrastructure projects, proposes a strategy for the development of all modes of transport;

 protection of the sea from pollution from ships; seaports, maritime domain and delimitation of maritime domain, maritime insurance and maritime agencies; ports on inland waterways; land freight transport centers; airports;

 means of transport other than those falling within the scope of work of other ministries;

 inspection activities: safety of navigation at sea, domestic and international road traffic and roads, except for activities within the scope of the Ministry of the Interior, safety of railway transport, safety of lifts, cable cars and lifts, safety of air navigation and safety of navigation on inland waters

 electronic communications, information society (except activities within the scope of other central state administration bodies) and postal services, preparation of draft laws and other regulations in the field of electronic communications and postal services, ensuring and implementing established policy and application of laws and other regulations in the field of electronic communications and postal services, drafting strategies, strategic plans, studies, guidelines and programs for the development of electronic communications and postal services in the Republic of Croatia and drafting plans for their implementation, drafting analyzes and reports and preparing proposals for measures and plans for developing and improving electronic communications communications and postal services and in domestic and international postal traffic, preparation of draft laws and other regulations in the field of radio equipment and electromagnetic compatibility, cooperation in monitoring, determining and analyzing indicators of development of information and communication technologies (ICT), especially broadband services and technologies, drafting measures and plans to encourage the development and improvement of the market in ICT services and infrastructure, with special emphasis on broadband services and technologies, drafting the position of the Republic of Croatia, expert bases, analysis, reports, plans and other documents for the purpose of performing European affairs in the field of electronic communications, information society, radio equipment, electromagnetic compatibility and postal services, participation in European and international organizations and institutions and working bodies of the Council of the European Union electronic communications, information society and postal services, participation in interstate meetings and negotiations in the field of electronic communications, information society and postal services, cooperation in the preparation and drafting of proposals for international treaties, agreements and conventions in the field of electronic communications communications, information society and postal services and the preparation of draft laws on the ratification of these international acts

The Ministry of the Sea, Transport and Infrastructure performs administrative, professional and other tasks related to:

 organizing the development of strategic infrastructure projects and investment programs for all modes of transport, of special importance to the Republic of Croatia and preparing proposals to the Government of the Republic of Croatia for their approval and implementation;

 organization of appropriate large infrastructure investment works in the construction of transport infrastructure facilities and devices, except for their reconstruction and maintenance, and other appropriate major infrastructure works important for sustainable development of the Republic of Croatia which are fully or largely financed from the state budget; entities in the construction of such facilities and monitors and controls these investments,

 and performs professional tasks related to the initiation, harmonization and supervision of activities determined by acts and regulations governing the overall development of traffic.

Organization
The Ministry of Sea, Transport and Infrastructure has a total of 1,008 staff (as of January 2022), working in the following departments:

Officials
Currently serving officials at the Ministry (as of January 2022):

Minister
 Oleg Butković, Minister of Maritime Affairs, Transport and Infrastructure

Secretaries of State 

 Tomislav Mihotić, Secretary of State for Road Traffic, Road Infrastructure and Inspection (državni tajnik za cestovni promet, cestovnu infrastrukturu i inspekciju)
 Josip Bilaver, Secretary of State for the Sea and EU Funds (državni tajnik za more i EU fondove)
 Alen Gospočić, Secretary of State for Railways, Post and Electronic Telecommunications (državni tajnik za željeznicu, poštu i elektroničke telekomunikacije)

Directors of management 
 Nina Perko, Director of the Maritime Administration (Ravnateljica uprave pomorstva)
 Duška Kunštek, Director of the Inland Navigation Directorate (Ravnateljica uprave za unutarnju plovidbu)
 Siniša Orlić, Director of the Directorate for Navigation Safety (Ravnatelj Uprave za sigurnost plovidbe)
 Krešo Antonović, Director of the Directorate of Air Transport, Electronic Communications and Post (Ravnatelj Uprave zračnog prometa, elektroničkih komunikacije i pošte)
 Damir Šoštarić, Director of the Directorate for EU Funds and Strategic Planning (Ravnatelj Uprave za EU fondove i strateško planiranje)
Melita Štrbić, Director of the Directorate for Budget and Finance (Ravnatelj Uprave za proračun i financije)

Assistant minister 

 Mario Madunić, Directorate for Road Traffic, Road Infrastructure and Inspection (Uprava za cestovni promet, cestovnu infrastrukturu i inspekciju)

See also

 Port captaincies of the Republic of Croatia

 Hydrographic Institute of the Republic of Croatia

 Inhabited Islands of Croatia
 Transport in Croatia
 Croatian Railways
 Hrvatske ceste
 Hrvatske autoceste

References

External links
Official Ministry website

Maritime Affairs, Transport and Infrastructure
Croatia
Croatia
Croatia
Transport organizations based in Croatia